It Had to Be You is a contemporary romance novel by Susan Elizabeth Phillips. It is the first book in the Chicago Stars series

It was awarded the RITA award for "Best romance novel" of 1994.

References

RITA Award-winning works
1994 films
1994 American novels
Contemporary romance novels
Avon (publisher) books
American romance novels